Muhammad Bashir (born 15 May 1935) is a Pakistani former swimmer. He competed in the men's 200 metre breaststroke at the 1952 Summer Olympics.

References

1935 births
Living people
Pakistani male swimmers
Olympic swimmers of Pakistan
Swimmers at the 1952 Summer Olympics
Place of birth missing (living people)
Male breaststroke swimmers